Justin Love (November 6, 1978 – June 23, 2020) was an American professional basketball player and coach.

College career 
Love was born in San Francisco and attended Washington High School and then Sacred Heart Cathedral High School, where he was MVP when the school won the West Catholic Athletic League Championship in 1995. He played collegiately at Cañada College, where he was a National Junior College All-American in 1998, and Saint Louis University, where he led the team to an NCAA Division I appearance and received a Conference USA First Team selection and Tournament MVP award in 2000. Love earned a bachelor's degree in Communication Disorders and a master's degree in Education at Saint Louis, and was inducted into the university's hall of fame in 2009. He was also inducted into the hall of fame at Sacred Heart Cathedral and in 2016 at Cañada College.

Professional career 
After graduation, Love went undrafted in the 2000 NBA draft, making him an unrestricted free agent. After participating in the Phoenix Suns' training camp, he signed a multi-year agreement with the team on August 1, 2000. On October 25, the Suns decided to waive him. Love went on to play for the Kansas City Knights, a newly-founded team that competed in the American Basketball Association's inaugural season.

In February 2001, he accepted BCM Gravelines-Dunkerque's offer to play in the LNB Pro A league, but was released a month later due to difficulties adapting to European basketball. He returned to St. Louis, briefly starring in the local St. Louis SkyHawks of the USBL before moving to China.

In 2002, Love signed with Beijing Olympians and played two seasons in the Chinese Basketball Association (CBA), locking in an Asia-Basket All-CBA Imports 2nd Team selection in 2004. After briefly returning to the St. Louis SkyHawks, he moved to Latvia, signing with BK Ventspils. Over the next four seasons, he carved out a solid leadership role within his teams, consistently posting double digit scoring averages and maintaining a high three-point shooting percentage (40%). Despite his 1.88m (6ft 2in) stature, his remarkable rebounding skills yielded nearly a rebound every seven minutes of playing time in the ULEB Cup. He was Latvian League Player of the Year in the 2004–05 season.

He spent the last six years of his professional career in Ukraine, signing with MBC Mykolaiv for two seasons in 2009 and then with BC Odessa for another four seasons. He continued to show impressive consistency, even with age, averaging double figures in scoring, solid outside shooting percentages and rebounding averages until his last season (2014-15).

Coaching career 
After retiring as a player, Love became an assistant coach at Belleville High School-West in Illinois, and in 2017 boys' basketball head coach at Mascoutah High School. In his three years with the Indians, he coached the team to a 55-42 record, winning the IHSA Class 3A regional championship in 2019, and was subsequently named the Illinois Basketball Association's boys Coach of the Year.

Personal life and death 
Love married Katy Walter in 2006; they had three children.

On June 23, 2020, Love was found unresponsive on the grounds of Mascoutah High School. He was pronounced dead at a local hospital.

References 

1978 births
2020 deaths
American expatriate basketball people in China
American expatriate basketball people in France
American expatriate basketball people in Germany
American expatriate basketball people in Latvia
American expatriate basketball people in Ukraine
American men's basketball coaches
American men's basketball players
Basketball coaches from California
Basketball players from San Francisco
BC Odesa players
BCM Gravelines players
BK Ventspils players
High school basketball coaches in Illinois
Junior college men's basketball players in the United States
MBC Mykolaiv players
Riesen Ludwigsburg players
Saint Louis Billikens men's basketball players